The Greater Philadelphia Hispanic Chamber of Commerce (GPHCC) is a 501(c)3 not-for-profit organization in the Philadelphia region focused on Hispanic businesses and professionals. The GPHCC serves three major constituents: (1) minority owned businesses, (2) minority professionals, and (3) large mainstream businesses.

In 2006-7, the GPHCC won the Small-Sized Chamber of the Year
In 2011-12, the Greater Philadelphia Hispanic Chamber of Commerce won the Medium-Sized Chamber of Commerce of the Year.

The Chamber maintains an active relationship with the Small Business Administration in assisting small business owners to grow their businesses.

In 2013, the GPHCC was named as a partner with the Goldman Sachs 10,000 Small Businesses initiative to recruit small businesses to attend the program held at the Community College of Philadelphia.  The curriculum will be provided by Babson, a business school ranked #1  in Entrepreneurship by U.S. News & World Report.

In 2014, the GPHCC, in partnership with Temple Fox School of Business, released "The State of Hispanic Business", the first-ever report on Hispanic business in the Greater Philadelphia region.

Goldman Sachs will provide $15 million in lending capital in Philadelphia plus education and support services to entrepreneurs through its nationwide 10,000 Small Businesses program.

In Spring 2016 the GPHCC relocated its headquarters to 1520 Locust Street, Suite 1001, Philadelphia, PA 19102.

Board of directors
As of April 2017, the Board consisted of:

Louis Rodriguez
Chairman
Rodriguez Consulting, LLC

Anthony Rosado
Vice-Chairman
Wells Fargo

Luis Liceaga
Treasurer
Impact Dimensions, LLC

James Wujcik
Secretary
Santander

Gregory DeShields
Parliamentarian
Philadelphia Multicultural Affairs Congress

Miguel Amador
Ritmo Wireless

Daniel Bentancourt
Community First Fund
 Edwin Roman
Customers Bank

Ramiro Carbonell, Esq.
Stevens and Lee

Claudia Roemer
Bank of America

Jaime Garrido
Montgomery County Community College

Lydia Holiat
The Haverford Trust Company

Paul Lima
Lima Consulting Group

Mercy Mosquera
Tierra Colombiana/Mixto

David Vicente
TD Bank

Affiliate organizations
United States Hispanic Chamber of Commerce
Greater Philadelphia Chamber of Commerce

See also
10,000 Small Businesses
Small Business Administration

References

External links
 
 10,000 Small Businesses Website

Chambers of commerce in the United States
501(c)(3) organizations
Goldman Sachs
Organizations established in 1990
1990 establishments in Pennsylvania